Paulo Leonardo Cassinerio (born 27 October 1953) is an Argentine politician who served as a National Deputy elected in Córdoba Province from 2017 to 2021. A member of the Justicialist Party, Cassinerio forms part of the provincial Hacemos por Córdoba (HPC) alliance.

Cassinerio's first political position was as coordinator of the "Volver al Trabajo" ("Return to Work") programme at the Córdoba provincial government, from 2002 to 2004. In 2005, he was appointed general coordinator of the Youth Programme at the Youth Secretariat of the provincial government. From 2011 to 2017, he worked at the Córdoba municipal government.

Cassinerio ran for a seat in the lower house of the National Congress in the 2017 legislative election, as the third candidate in the Union for Córdoba list. The list was the second-most voted in the province, with 30.52% of the vote, and Cassinerio was elected.

As a national deputy, Cassinerio formed part of the parliamentary commissions on Sports, Budget and Treasury, and Addiction Prevention. Cassinerio was an opponent of the legalization of abortion in Argentina, voting against the two Voluntary Interruption of Pregnancy bills, which passed the Chamber in 2018 and 2020.

References

External links
Profile on the official website of the Chamber of Deputies (in Spanish)

Living people
1979 births
Members of the Argentine Chamber of Deputies elected in Córdoba
Politicians from Córdoba, Argentina
Justicialist Party politicians
21st-century Argentine politicians